Bogert's coral snake (Micrurus bogerti) is a species of venomous snake in the family Elapidae. The species is endemic to southern Mexico.

Etymology
The specific name, bogerti, is in honor of American herpetologist Charles Mitchill Bogert.

Geographic range
M. bogerti is native to the Pacific coast of Oaxaca in Mexico, ranging from Puerto Angel to San Pedro Tapanatepec.

Habitat
Known from a few specimens from four localities, M. bogerti is found in tropical deciduous forest, dry coastal forest, and scrub forest.

Description
M. bogerti has a black snout, followed by a yellow parietal band, followed by a black nuchal band. The body is red with 16–19 black rings. The black rings, which are narrower than the red spaces between them, are edged with yellow or white rings which are even narrower. The red spaces are 6–8 dorsal scales wide; the black rings, 3–4 dorsals; and the yellow or white rings, 1–2 dorsals.

Reproduction
M. bogerti is oviparous.

Conservation status
No conservations measures are known, but M. bogerti is protected by Mexican law.

Taxonomy
There are no recognized subspecies of M. bogerti.

References

Further reading
Campbell JA, Lamar WW (1989). The Venomous Reptiles of Latin America. Ithaca, New York: Comstock Publishing Associates, a Division of Cornell University Press. xiv + 430 pp., 568 figures, 109 distribution maps, 31 tables. .
Heimes P (2016). Snakes of Mexico: Herpetofauna Mexicana Vol. I. Frankfurt am Main, Germany: Chimaira. 572 pp. .
Liner EA (2007). "A Checklist of the Amphibians and Reptiles of México". Occasional Papers of the Museum of Natural Science, Louisiana State University 80: 1–60. (Micrurus bogert, p. 53).
Mata-Silva V, Johnson JD, Wilson LD, García-Padilla E (2015). "The herpetofauna of Oaxaca, Mexico: composition, physiographic distribution, and conservation status". Mesoamerican Herpetology 2 (1): 6–62.
Roze, Jánis A. (1967). " A Check List of the New World Venomous Coral Snakes (Elapidae), with Descriptions of New Forms". American Museum Novitates (2287): 1-60. (Micrurus bogerti, new species, pp. 9–11, Figure 3).

Micrurus
Reptiles described in 1967
Endemic reptiles of Mexico